Atala Masjid or Atala Mosque is a -14th century mosque in Jaunpur, Uttar Pradesh, India. 

It is 300 meter away from Shahi Qila, Jaunpur.It is 2.2 km north-northeast of Jaunpur, 7.3 km northwest of Zafarābād, 16.8 km north-northeast of Mariāhū, 26.3 km west-northwest of Kirākat.

Description
In 1377 A.D., Firuz Shah Tughlaq began the building of the mosque on the foundations of a Hindu temple dedicated to Atala Devi, and also using stones from the old temple. The Mosque was completed by Ibrahim Shah Sharqi of the Jaunpur Sultanate in 1408 A.D.

Its height is more than 100 ft. There are three huge gateways for the entrance. The total perimeter of the mosque is 248 ft. Its construction was begun by Feroze Shah in 1393 A.D.

William Hodges in his book Select Views in India mentions this mosque. 

A Madarsa named Madarsa Din Dunia is housed in central courtyard of the mosque. The Mosque is on the List of Monuments/Sites of Archaeological Survey of India of Directorate of Archaeology, (U.P.) and on list List of Monuments of Archaeological Survey of India.

Architecture
The central dome is almost 17 meters high above the ground, but cannot be seen from the front because of the tall tower (at 23 meters).

See also
Shahi Bridge, Jaunpur
Jama Masjid, Jaunpur

References

Sources
 Michell, George (ed). Architecture of the Islamic World: Its History and Social Meaning. London: Thames and Hudson, 272.
 Nath, R. 1978. History of Sultanate Architecture. New Delhi, Abhinav Publications, 98-100.
 Williams, John A. and Caroline. 1980. Architecture of Muslim India. Set 4: The Sultanate of Jaunpur about 1360-1480. Santa Barbara, California: Visual Education, Inc.

External links

 ATALA MASJID/JAUNPUR
 Legacy of the Sharqi Kingdom of Jaunpur
 Columbia edu article

Religious buildings and structures completed in 1408
15th-century mosques
Sharqi architecture
Mosques in Uttar Pradesh
Buildings and structures in Jaunpur, Uttar Pradesh
Tourist attractions in Jaunpur, Uttar Pradesh